Koori Radio (callsign 2LND), formerly Radio Redfern, is a community radio station based in Redfern broadcasting to Sydney on a citywide licence.  It is part of the Gadigal Information Service (GIS) and is the only radio station in Sydney providing full-time broadcasting to the Aboriginal and Torres Strait Islander community.

History

Koori Radio grew out of Radio Redfern, which was established in the early 1980s. Originally it had programme time on other community station Radio Skid Row.  During Australia's Bicentennial in 1988, Radio Redfern played a pivotal role in informing and educating the public about Indigenous responses to the celebration. It also acted as a communication channel for the thousands of Indigenous people from around Australia who had gathered in Sydney for protests. In 1993 Koori Radio came under the umbrella of Gadigal Information Service. It was then part of a series of national Indigenous radio broadcasts during the Sydney 2000 Olympics.

Koori Radio conducted 19 test broadcasts while it was applying for a licence. The ACMA granted the licence in June 2001. Koori Radio began full-time broadcasting in December 2001 with a 1 kW transmitter.  It switched to a new 50 kW transmitter in December 2003.

In 2005, the Indigenous Land Corporation purchased the buildings on Cope Street occupied by Radio Redfern and the Black Theatre. In 2008 Koori Radio received Australian Government funding to move into purpose-built studios with Black Theatre in Redfern. A new building was designed by architects Tonkin Zulaikha Greer to accommodate the recording studios and offices of the Gadigal Information Service, with exterior artwork created by Aboriginal artist Adam Hill. The building was opened in 2008.

Author and academic Anita Heiss was voluntary chair of the radio station until 2008.

Programming

Koori Radio is the city's only Indigenous Australian music station.  The music format is one third Australian Indigenous, one third world Indigenous and one-third other black music. The station broadcasts live from 07:00 to 00:00 with a music service overnight. It is a volunteer-run organisation and is funded through listener support, grants and limited commercial sponsorship.

As well as its format of Indigenous and black music, the station broadcasts news, current affairs, sport and listener involvement programs.  There are also programs by the Samoan and Māori communities.

Koori Radio's flagship program is Blackchat, a daily current affairs program on weekday mornings committed to discussing news, issues and events from an Indigenous perspective. Koori Radio also contributes programming to the National Indigenous Radio Service.

Koori Radio's programming also features Koori Radio Sport, an entertainment programme that covers the latest in sport news, with a focus on Aboriginal and Torres Strait Islander players. Richard Baini is a regular co-host of Koori Radio Sport and is best known for his segment Richie's Rants.

It also features Marloo's Blues, a programme of blues and roots music hosted by Marlene Cummins.

Recognition
The Gadigal Information Service is the subject of an interview with Lily Shearer in an episode of the 2013 TV documentary series Desperate Measures. It is available on SBS on Demand.

See also	
List of radio stations in Australia
Australian Indigenous Communications Association

References

External links

Radio stations in Sydney
Community radio stations in Australia
Indigenous Australian radio
Koori Radio
2002 establishments in Australia